Local Utpaat is an Indian Assamese-language kung fu comedy film directed by Kenny Deori Basumatary.

Plot 
The story revolve around three friend: Amit, Jonny, Montu, and Amit girlfriend.

Cast 
 Kenny Basumatary
 Poonam Gurung
 Bonny Deori
 Johnny Deori
 Bibhash Singha
 Tony Deori Basumatary
 Yatharth Agnihotri
 Sarmistha Chakravorty

Release 
Bollywood actor and martial artist Vidyut Jammwal gave financial support to the film. The film was planned to be dubbed in Hindi.

Reception 
Kalpa Jyoti Bhuyan of The News Mill opined that "Local Utpaat is not just about ‘utpaat’ in it. It is also about our local dreams, our local love stories and our very own personal successes and failures". A critic from Northeast Today wrote that "To write such a compact screenplay and blend it with the right amount of pure action and comedy needs mastery. Despite having some loose moments, the film will not disappoint its audience in general and particularly those who have been following Local Kung fu and Utpaat genre in Assam". An independent critic rated the film 3.5 out of 5.

Box office 
The film collected 40 lakh Indian rupees in its first week.

References

External links 
 

2020s Assamese-language films
2022 films
Assamese-language films
Films set in Assam
Indian comedy films
Indian martial arts films
Kung fu films